In the U.S. state of California, a congestion management agency (abbreviated CMA) is a county-level government agency responsible for a comprehensive transportation improvement program that reduces traffic congestion and reduces transportation-related air pollution through local land-use planning.

Under the California State Legislature to implement Proposition 111 (also known as the Traffic Congestion Relief and Spending Limitation Act of 1990), each county with 50,000 or more residents in other words, any county required to have a metropolitan planning organization under federal law must also designate a local government agency to develop a congestion management program (CMP) or forfeit its share of state gasoline tax revenues. In 1996, Assembly Bill 2419 allowed counties to opt out of the CMP requirement by implementing an alternative mechanism for congestion management and made the CMP voluntary for counties with fewer than 200,000 residents. San Diego County at one point opted out of the CMP in favor of a regional fee applied to new developments.

List of congestion management agencies 
Each county designates a local government agency as its CMA. The designated agencies are a variety of public transportation districts, joint powers authorities, and councils of governments.

 Alameda County: Alameda County Transportation Commission
 Contra Costa County: Contra Costa Transportation Authority
 Fresno County: Fresno Council of Governments
 Imperial County: 
 Kern County: Kern Council of Governments
 Kings County: 
 Los Angeles County: Los Angeles County Metropolitan Transportation Authority
 Madera County: 
 Marin County: Transportation Authority of Marin
 Merced County: 
 Monterey County: Transportation Agency for Monterey County
 Napa County: Napa Valley Transportation Authority
 Orange County: Orange County Transportation Authority
 Placer County: Placer County Transportation Planning Agency
 Riverside County: Riverside County Transportation Commission
 Sacramento County: Sacramento Area Council of Governments
 San Benito County: 
 San Bernardino County: San Bernardino County Transportation Authority
 San Diego County: San Diego Association of Governments
 San Francisco: San Francisco County Transportation Authority
 San Joaquin County: San Joaquin Council of Governments
 San Luis Obispo County: none since 1996
 San Mateo County: City/County Association of Governments of San Mateo County
 Santa Barbara County: Santa Barbara County Association of Governments
 Santa Clara County: Santa Clara Valley Transportation Authority
 Santa Cruz County: Santa Cruz County Regional Transportation Commission
 Shasta County: Shasta County Regional Transportation Planning Agency
 Solano County: Solano Transportation Authority
 Sonoma County: Sonoma County Transportation Authority
 Stanislaus County: Stanislaus Council of Governments
 Sutter County: 
 Tulare County: Tulare County Association of Governments
 Ventura County: Ventura County Transportation Commission
 Yolo County: Yolo County Transportation District
 Yuba County:

See also 
 Transportation improvement district
 Transportation demand management

References

Further reading 
 

County government agencies in California
Special districts of California
Urban planning organizations
Transportation planning